Arthrobacter alpinus is a psychrotrophic, Gram-positive and aerobic bacterium species from the genus Arthrobacter which has been isolated from alpine soil from the Grossglockner area from the mountain range Hohe Tauern, in Austria.

References

Further reading

External links
Type strain of Arthrobacter alpinus at BacDive -  the Bacterial Diversity Metadatabase

Bacteria described in 2010
Psychrophiles
Micrococcaceae